Hawleyville is an unincorporated community in Fairfield County in the town of Newtown, Connecticut, about 1 mile outside the borough of Newtown. It was listed as a census-designated place prior to the 2020 census.

History
Hawleyville is named after the family of Glover Hawley. This was a condition Hawley included in the sale of land to the Housatonic Railroad Company in the nineteenth century. Hawleyville briefly emerged as a railroad center, causing Newtown's population to grow to over 4,000 circa 1881. The railroads included the New York and New England Railroad and the Hawleyville Branch of the Danbury and Norwalk Railroad. As of 2018, the Housatonic Railroad Company owns a lumber distribution and bulk transfer facility in Hawleyville.

Hawleyville gained a sewer system in 2001, which was subsequently expanded upon in 2016. It utilizes the nearby Danbury, Connecticut, sewage plant.

Emergency services
The area is served by Hawleyville Volunteer Fire and Rescue.

References

External links
List of Principal Communities in Connecticut
Hawleyville on Google Maps

Newtown, Connecticut
Neighborhoods in Connecticut
Unincorporated communities in Connecticut
Populated places in Fairfield County, Connecticut
Census-designated places in Fairfield County, Connecticut
Census-designated places in Connecticut